Patani is a Local Government Area of Delta State, Nigeria. Its headquarters are in the town of Patani.

It has an area of 217 km and a population of 67,707 at the 2006 census.

The postal code of the area is 333.

References

Local Government Areas in Delta State